Getena Gewog (Dzongkha: གད་སྟག་ན,Getana Gewog་) is a gewog (village block) of Chukha District, Bhutan. The gewog has an area of 214 square kilometres. It contains 7 villages and 118 households.

References 

Gewogs of Bhutan
Chukha District